RTCN Białystok (Krynice) (Radio and Television Broadcasting Center; , RTCN) is a  tall guyed mast for FM and TV situated at Krynice near Białystok in Podlaskie Voivodeship, Poland. The structure was built in 1996 by Mostostal Zabrze, Katowice, PL and is the seventh tallest structure in Poland (since the collapse of the communist-built Warsaw radio mast). The mast is owned by TP EmiTel z o.o.

There is a second guyed mast at the same location which was manufactured by Mostostal Zabrze and erected by Białostockie Przedsiębiorstwo Budownictwa Miejskiego between April and September, 1962. It commenced regular broadcasting on 23 December 1962.

Major Transmitters
The licensed transmitters at this location are:

Antenna Configuration
 Circular antenna of type ADT 8015 at height of 313m, 16 floors high, on 4 sides, polarization horizontal, gain 15.46 dB, resistance 2.1 dB, transmitting at frequency of 479.25 MHz (TVP2).
 Circular antenna of type EAP 303 at height of 282.8m, 8 floors high, on 4 sides, polarization horizontal, gain 12 dB, resistance 2.1 dB, transmitting at frequency of 191.25 MHz (TVP1).
 Circular antenna of type ADB 4104 at height of 236 m, 4 floors high, on 6 sides, polarization vertical, gain 8.62 dB, resistance 1.02 dB, transmitting at frequency of 92.3 MHz (Polskie Radio Program I)
 Circular antenna of type ADB 4210 at height of 213 m, 8 floors high, on 3 sides, polarization horizontal, gain 9.39 dB, resistance 0.96 dB, transmitting at frequency of 100.2 MHz (RMF FM).

Gallery

See also
 List of masts

References

External links
 Zakłady Elektroniczne WAREL S.A.
 http://emi.emitel.pl/EMITEL/obiekty.aspx?obiekt=DODR_E1A
 http://www.skyscraperpage.com/diagrams/?b46202
 http://www.mostostal.zabrze.pl/index.php?p=bigtmpl&src=html_pl%2Fzakres_dzialalnosci005_big.html&item=1107
 
 http://radiopolska.pl/wykaz/pokaz_lokalizacja.php?pid=99

Radio masts and towers in Poland
Białystok County
Buildings and structures in Podlaskie Voivodeship